Senior Tour may refer to:

 PGA Tour Champions, a tour for American senior male golfers
 European Senior Tour, a tour for European senior male golfers
 Legends Tour, a tour for senior female golfers
 Outback Champions Series, a tour for senior male tennis players